Quảng Uyên is a township and capital of Quảng Hòa District, Cao Bằng Province.

The township was the district capital of former Quảng Uyên District.

References

Populated places in Cao Bằng province
Townships in Vietnam